Saint-Ciers-sur-Gironde (literally Saint-Ciers on Gironde) is a commune in the Gironde department in Nouvelle-Aquitaine in southwestern France.

Population

See also
Communes of the Gironde department

References

Communes of Gironde